In many English-speaking countries, a telegram messenger, more often known as a telegram delivery boy, telegraph boy or telegram boy was a young man employed to deliver telegrams, usually on bicycle. In the United Kingdom, they were employed by the General Post Office; in the United States, they worked for Western Union or other telegraph companies.

In the United Kingdom 
Telegram boys became popular in the United Kingdom after the General Post Office took over control of inland telegraphs from the railways and private telegraph companies. Many of the boys employed by these services to deliver telegrams transferred to the Post Office. In some respects the life of a telegram boy was not unlike that of someone in military service. They were expected to behave in a manner befitting one who wore the uniform of the Queen, and were required to complete a daily drill. From 1915 to 1921, morning exercise was added to these requirements.

During the 1930s the Post Office introduced motorcycles. This started in Leeds where boys aged 17 were allowed to volunteer for training, but only with the permission of their parents. However, following the success of this, motorcycles were soon introduced elsewhere in the country. The fleet was comprised almost exclusively of BSA B33-1 250cc motorbikes which boys were expected to ride at an average of 15 mph. Later 125cc BSA Bantams were used. These were finally replaced with smaller Raleigh and Puch models.

During its heyday in the 1930s, the service was delivering an average of 65 million telegrams per year; however, the service was running at a loss, estimated at £1 million annually.

Throughout the 1960s and 1970s the use of telegrams had dropped significantly, with around 10 million sent annually in the mid-1960s. Consequently, the Post Office took the decision in 1977 to abolish the service. The service continued for a few years and was briefly operated by British Telecom after it split from the Post Office. British Telecom announced on 19 October 1981 that the telegram would be discontinued, and it was finally taken out of service on 30 September 1982 after 139 years in the United Kingdom.

The telegram as such was superseded by the British Telecom Telemessage service, introduced in October 1982. Messages were dictated over the telephone or sent via telex, printed, and delivered overnight by first class post in a distinctive envelope guaranteed for next day delivery, rather than by messenger.

In the United States 

Telegraph boys (also referred to as district messenger boys, telegraph messenger boys, or simply as messenger boys) were uniformed young men between 10 and 18 years of age who carried telegrams through urban streets. In most areas they used bicycles; in some dense areas they went on foot. Unlike the men in the telegraph office who worked indoors on fixed wages under close supervision, enjoyed union benefits, and managed the electrical transfer of information, telegraph boys worked outdoors under no supervision on piece wages, saw no union benefits, and managed the physical aspect of the industry in the form of handwritten or printed paper messages.

Boys reported for work in the morning clad in their uniforms and awaited their assignments, receiving payment by the mile. Though some chose to travel by foot, bicycles were required for distant destinations. John Dickinson of Dallas, Texas accumulated more than 16,000 miles between April and September 1916. Western Union bought 5,000 bicycles a year and resold them to their telegraph boys nationwide at a discount. A local fleet might number from one to three dozen or more. Companies were responsible for providing uniform laundries, locker rooms, assembly halls, and classrooms. 

In the call-box system developed in 1872, a customer would ring the telegraph office for a messenger who would then speed to the customer's door to pick up a handwritten message and return to the telegraph office to have it sent electrically to its destination.

The life could be dangerous. Boys were expected to "scorch" their bicycles in urban traffic. Strikes occurred with messenger boys cycling en-masse to keep scabs from being hired. Boys attended continuation schools on a four-hours-per-week schedule rather than the 36-hour schedule of public schools.  During slack times, the telegraph office hid the boys from public view in basements and back rooms where they smoked, read penny dreadfuls, and shot craps.  Weekends or evenings might involve taking part in uniformed military drills before the public.  At night, the boys might be required to enter the red light districts in connection with their job duties. The demand for telegraph boys fell when companies began reading messages over the telephone.

In the autumn of 1913, bicycling telegraph boy Robert Crawford of Washington, D.C. collided with a car carrying President Woodrow Wilson. The President sent his personal physician to attend Crawford. Later, he visited the boy in the hospital and presented him with a new bicycle. "I did not know it was the President's car that I ran into," the boy said. Wilson replied, "I rather thought it was the President's car that ran into you."

Notable telegram boys 
 Frank McCourt, author and teacher
 Ralph Reader, founder of the Scout Gang Shows
 Dave Ward, deputy leader of the Communication Workers Union
 Hyman G. Rickover, Father of the US Nuclear Navy
 Iain Pattison, writer of Rab C Nesbit was a telegram boy in the mid-1960s
 Keith Holyoake, Prime Minister of New Zealand

See also 

Bicycle messenger
Cargo bike
Child labour
Courier
Outline of cycling
Package delivery
Paperboy or papergirl

References

External links 
 The British Postal Museum and Archive - Telegram Messengers
 A Telegram Boy. 1942 - 1945 by John Vickers WW2 People's War, BBC Online
 Motorbike messengers of death and fortune, Medway Memories
 Site for former Telegram Messenger Boys
 Site for former Leicestershire Telegram Messenger Boys

Telegraphy